Marcelo Pinheiro Davi de Melo (born September 23, 1983) is a Brazilian professional tennis player from Belo Horizonte. Primarily a doubles specialist, his career-high doubles ranking is No. 1, which he first reached in November 2015. Melo is the only Brazilian ever to top the ATP doubles rankings.

He is a two-time Grand Slam champion in doubles, having won the 2015 French Open alongside Ivan Dodig and the 2017 Wimbledon Championships with Łukasz Kubot. Melo was also the first Brazilian man ever to win a Grand Slam doubles title. He has won 35 doubles titles on the ATP Tour, including nine at Masters 1000 level. He reached the final at the 2013 Wimbledon Championships and 2018 US Open in men's doubles, as well as at the 2009 French Open in mixed doubles. Melo also finished runner-up in doubles at the ATP Finals in 2014 and 2017.

He has represented Brazil in the Davis Cup since 2008, often playing doubles alongside André Sá or Bruno Soares, and has also competed at three editions of the Summer Olympic Games.

Career

2007
After playing with different Brazilian partners in doubles, including André Sá, Melo went through a relatively successful period of his career, reaching the semifinals of Wimbledon doubles, with some matches lasting four hours. Melo and Sá reached the quarterfinals of the US Open. Also in 2007 they won the tournament title of ATP 250 Estoril.
Melo won the Buenos Aires Challenger without André Sá, who also was not in Adelaide triumph, the first week of 2008 when Melo played with the Argentine Martín García.

2008
In 2008, Melo partnered with André Sá and had a good campaign, winning three ATPs togetherCosta do Sauípe, Poertschach and New Haven. They came to play in the Masters Cup, in which the top eight doubles in the world compete, but they ended the year ranked No. 9 in the Champions Race; this was because Melo was injured in Wimbledon and took time to recover, and Melo and Sá had not made any major campaign in the Masters Series and Grand Slams. Melo and Sá later went on to play as reserves in the Masters Cup. They also participated in the 2008 Beijing Olympics.

2009

In 2009, Melo and Sá won one ATP and reached the final of two other competitions. At Roland Garros, Melo reached the final of the Mixed Doubles with American player Vania King, losing the final by two sets to one. This was the first time since 2001 that a Brazilian reached the final of a Grand Slam. In ATP 500 Hamburg, a tournament that had once been a Masters Series, Melo and his partner, the Slovak Filip Polášek, finished as the runners-up. At the end of the year, Melo announced the end of his partnership with André Sá and his new partnership with Bruno Soares.

2010
In 2010, Melo and Soares reached the final of the ATP 250 Auckland at the beginning of the year. After that, they did not play well until May, when Melo won the title of the ATP 250 Nice. At Roland Garros, they defeated the brothers Bob Bryan and Mike Bryan, the world's top doubles players, and reached the quarterfinal. They subsequently reached the semifinals of the ATP 500 Hamburg, the final of the ATP 250 Gstaad, the third round of the US Open, the final of the ATP 250 Metz, and the semifinals of the ATP 500 Tokyo and ATP 250 Stockholm.

2011
In 2011, Melo and Soares won two consecutive titles in the ATP 250 Chile and Brazil and were runners-up in the ATP 500 Acapulco. They reached the semifinals of the ATP 250 Nice and Eastbourne, and Melo reached the Newport semifinal with André Sá. In August, Melo and Soares competed in the semifinals of the ATP 500 Washington. In September, playing with Lukáš Dlouhý, Melo reached the final of the ATP 250 Metz.  In October, with Soares, he reached the semifinals of the ATP 500 Valencia and the Japan Open Tennis Championships, and later the final of the ATP 250 Stockholm.  In November, Melo and Soares reached the quarterfinals of the Masters 1000 Paris. At the end of the year, Marcelo Melo and Bruno Soares ended their partnership.

2012

In 2012, playing with Ivan Dodig, Melo was the runner-up at ATP 500 Memphis and reached the quarterfinals of Roland Garros and Wimbledon. He was also a quarterfinalist at the Masters 1000 Madrid with Marin Čilić. Melo participated in the 2012 Summer Olympics with Bruno Soares; they reached the quarterfinals after defeating the duo Berdych and Stepanek by 24–22 in the last set.

In the second half of 2012, Melo was a semifinalist in the Masters 1000 Cincinnati and reached the third round of the US Open playing with Dodig. In October, partnered with Cilic, Melo was a semifinalist in the Masters 1000 Shanghai. With this, Melo reached the best rank in his career for the second time, reaching the 18th position worldwide. Playing with Soares, Melo won his 10th ATP doubles title in the ATP 250 Stockholm, reaching the 17th position worldwide. In the Masters 1000 Paris, Melo reached the semifinals, partnered with Cilic.

2013

In 2013, Melo won the ATP 250 Brisbane in preparation for the Australian Open, along with Tommy Robredo; this was his 11th ATP title. In February, Melo defeated the Bryan brothers in the US and partnered with Bruno Soares in the Davis Cup. In March, Melo reached the quarterfinals of the Masters 1000 Indian Wells with Dodig, and in May, he reached the third round of Roland Garros. At Wimbledon 2013, Melo performed the best campaign of his career, reaching the final of the tournament. With this, Melo attained his best career ranking, reaching 14th position.

In the US Open in 2013, he reached the semifinals for the first time in his career and again broke his personal record, reaching 11th position. Melo won his first Masters 1000 title in October; playing with Dodig, they won Masters 1000 Shanghai, defeating Roger Federer and also the Bryan brothers. Melo became for the first time a world top 10 player, reaching the 8th position of the ATP rankings. He also reached the semifinals of the Masters 1000 Paris, first reaching the world doubles top 5.

2014
In 2014, Melo's best results were the semifinal of the US Open, the final of the ATP World Finals, the final of the Masters 1000 Monte Carlo and Canada, the final of the ATP 500 in Rio and Tokyo, and the title of the ATP 250 Auckland. Remained in the top 10 world doubles throughout the year.

2015: First Grand Slam title and World No. 1
In 2015, Melo had a great first half of the year by reaching the semifinals of the Australian Open for the first time. Melo won the Acapulco tournament and reached the semifinals of the first three Masters 1000 of the year: Indian Wells, Miami, and Monte Carlo. In June, he won his maiden doubles Grand Slam of his career, winning Roland Garros alongside Ivan Dodig by defeating The Bryan brothers in the final. At Wimbledon, Melo reached the quarterfinals.

In Cincinnati, Melo reached his fourth Masters 1000 level semifinal of the year. In October, Melo won back-to-back-to-back tournaments, first in Tokyo, followed by the Shanghai Masters (with Raven Klaasen). In Vienna, playing alongside Łukasz Kubot, Melo guaranteed his place at the top of the ATP doubles ranking by advancing to the semifinal. Melo and Kubot went on to win the tournament.

2016: Two Masters titles

After 22 weeks in ATP No. 1 doubles ranking, Melo was surpassed by Jamie Murray on April 4.
Melo returned to ATP No. 1 doubles ranking on May 9 and he stayed until on June 6, 2016.
Melo alongside Ivan Dodig won two Masters 1000 doubles tournaments (Toronto and Cincinnati). 

In October, Melo partnered with Łukasz Kubot and defeated Oliver Marach and Fabrice Martin to win the Vienna Open doubles title.

2017: Wimbledon men's doubles champion

In March, Melo, with his doubles partner Łukasz Kubot, reached the doubles final at Indian Wells Masters. Eighth-seeded Melo and Kubot reached the BNP Paribas Open semi-finals after breezing past tricky wild card duo Nick Kyrgios and Nenad Zimonjić. The Brazilian-Polish pair then defeated fourth seeds Jamie Murray and Bruno Soares to reach the final against the sixth seeds, South Africa's Raven Klaasen and his American doubles partner, Rajeev Ram. At the 2017 Miami Open Melo and Kubot dropped only three sets en route to the final, defeating Marcus Daniell & Marcelo Demoliner, Jean-Julien Rojer & Horia Tecău, Jamie Murray & Bruno Soares in QF and Daniel Nestor & Brian Baker in SF to reach their second straight ATP Masters 1000 final. In the final the sixth-seeded Melo & Kubot defeated American duo Nick Monroe and Jack Sock in straight sets. They made it all the way together at an ATP event for the first time this season. It was their first ever Masters 1000 title won as a team as well.

At Wimbledon, coming from back-to-back grass-court titles at ‘s-Hertogenbosch and Halle, no. 4 seeds Melo and Kubot faced four five-set matches to claim the men's doubles crown (Melo's second major title), defeating No. 16 seeds Oliver Marach and Mate Pavić in a final which took 4 hours 39 minutes and five sets to complete.

In the second half of 2017, he lost the No. 1 position to Kontinen/Peers, but Melo/Kubot kept chasing the top, being finalists at ATP 500 Washington and Masters 1000 Shanghai in addition to the semifinal at Masters 1000 Cincinnati. In November, in the last Masters 1000 of the year, Paris, Kontinen/Peers needed to defend the title but lost in the quarterfinals, while Melo/Kubot, who did not defend anything, won the title. With that, Melo retook the world's No. 1, and Kubot reached the position of No. 2 for the first time.

2018: US Open runner-up
Melo remained the world's No. 1 until April. Finished the year keeping in the top 10. His best campaigns of the year were the title of the Shanghai Masters 1000 (the third of his career at this tournament) and the runner-up at the US Open (his best-ever campaign in the American Grand Slam).

2019: Two Masters 1000 finals & one ATP 250 title 
In 2019, Melo spent the year collecting finals and semifinals, which kept him in the top 10. His best campaigns were the runner-up of the Indian Wells and Shanghai Masters 1000 and the Vienna, Beijing, and Halle ATP 500. He won the 2019 Winston-Salem Open title in August.

Melo and partner Kubot were the second team to qualify for the 2019 Nitto ATP Finals. They qualified for the semifinals with a 2–1 record in the round-robin stage. In the semifinal they were defeated by eventual champions Pierre-Hugues Herbert and Nicolas Mahut, 6–3, 7–6.

2020: 35th ATP title 
In 2020, Melo continued his partnership in doubles with Łukasz Kubot.  The pair won the 2020 Abierto Mexicano Telcel and the 2020 Erste Bank Open.  They also reached the finals at 2020 Bett1Hulks Indoors, where they lost to the French pair, Pierre-Hugues Herbert and Nicolas Mahut. They qualified for the 2020 ATP Finals.  They did not make it out of the round-robin stage with a 1–2 record.

2021: New partnerships, reunion with Kubot
In 2021 he played first with Horia Tecau. They reached Australian Open 3rd round. After, he began a partnership with Jean-Julien Rojer. They did not reach very good results until May, with Doha and Madrid's second rounds as the best results. In Doha, he returned to play a single match after eight years. He lost in the qualifying first round against Tim Pütz (6–3, 6–2). He also played with Mischa Zverev in Munich (first-round loss) and with Marin Cilic in Rome Masters (first-round loss).

In Roland Garros, Melo and Kubot decided to return to play together.

2022: 70th final, tenth ATP 500 title
At the 2022 Rakuten Japan Open Tennis Championships, he won his 10th ATP 500 title and 36th overall partnering Mackenzie McDonald after defeating third seeds Rafael Matos and David Vega Hernández. It was also his 70th ATP final overall.

Personal life 
Melo's best friend on tour is Alexander Zverev. They first met at the 2015 Rotterdam Open.

Melo's older brother, Daniel, is himself a former tennis player who retired in 2006.

Performance timelines

Doubles
Current through the 2023 Indian Wells Masters.

Mixed doubles

Significant finals

Grand Slam finals

Doubles: 4 (2 titles, 2 runner-ups)

Mixed doubles: 1 (1 runner-up)

Year-end championships

Doubles: 2 (2 runner-ups)

Masters 1000 finals

Doubles: 15 (9 titles, 6 runner-ups)

ATP career finals

Doubles: 71 (36 titles, 35 runner-ups)

References

External links

 
 
 
 

Brazilian male tennis players
Doping cases in tennis
Olympic tennis players of Brazil
Sportspeople from Belo Horizonte
Tennis players at the 2008 Summer Olympics
Tennis players at the 2012 Summer Olympics
Tennis players at the 2016 Summer Olympics
Tennis players at the 2020 Summer Olympics
1983 births
Living people
French Open champions
Wimbledon champions
Grand Slam (tennis) champions in men's doubles
Brazilian sportspeople in doping cases
ATP number 1 ranked doubles tennis players
ITF World Champions
20th-century Brazilian people
21st-century Brazilian people